Fergus Baker (born 18 May 1987) is an English cricketer. He played five first-class matches for Cambridge University Cricket Club between 2007 and 2009.

See also
 List of Cambridge University Cricket Club players

References

External links
 

1987 births
Living people
English cricketers
Cambridge University cricketers
Cricketers from Leicester
Cambridge MCCU cricketers